Honolulu Community College is a public community college in Honolulu, Hawaii. It is one of ten branches of the University of Hawaii system and is accredited by the Accrediting Commission for Community and Junior Colleges.

HCC's strengths are in its industrial programs including such items as automotive and aircraft maintenance. The Marine Education and Training Center trains candidates for marine programs.

Campus
Campus art includes:
 Three Rocks on a Hill, copper and bronze sculpture by John Canto, 1975
 Hawaii Iridescence, glass tile mural by Frank Phillips, 1979
 Na Aumakua, koa wood and resin sculpture by Donald Harvey, 1977
 Installation by Bruce Hopper, 1975
 Just Passing Through, bronze and aluminium sculpture by Ralph Kouchi, 1988
 Stage Set - Mise En Scene, mixed media installation by Kathleen Takamoto, 1991 
 Woodscape, koa wood sculpture by Mamoru Sato, 1975  
 Petroglyphs Interchanging, concrete sculpture by Edward Stasack, 1972

Notable alumni
 Dustin Kimura, Welding Technology; professional mixed martial artist for the UFC

See also
 University of Hawaii

References

External links
Official website

Community colleges in Hawaii
University of Hawaiʻi
Education in Honolulu
Schools accredited by the Western Association of Schools and Colleges
Educational institutions established in 1920
1920 establishments in Hawaii